Scopula semispurcata is a moth of the  family Geometridae. It is found in New Guinea.

References

Moths described in 1898
semispurcata
Moths of New Guinea